The Kanakerha inscription, also spelled Kanakherha inscription, is an inscription found on the side of the hill of Sanchi, dating to the 3rd or 4th century CE.

The region of Sanchi-Vidisha was captured from the Satavahanas by the Western Satraps during the rule of Rudrasena II (255-278 CE), as shown by finds of his coinage in the area. The Western Satraps are then known to have remained in the area well into the 4th century, as shown by the Kanakherha inscription, on the hill of Sanchi.

The inscription mentions the construction of a well by the Saka (Gupta script: , Śaka) chief and "righteous conqueror" (dharmaviyagi mahadandanayaka) Sridharavarman (Gupta script: , Sridharavarmmana). Another inscription of the same Sridhavarman with his Naga military commander is known from Eran. At Eran, it seems that his inscription is succeeded by a monument and an inscription by Gupta Empire Samudragupta (r.336-380 CE), established "for the sake of augmenting his fame", who may therefore have ousted Sridharavarman in his campaigns to the West.

The inscription is in 6 lines, and bears a date of year 241 of the Saka era, the date of the record thus corresponding to 319 CE. Salomon gives an earlier date of 279 CE. It is written in mostly standard Sanskrit. 

The object of the inscription is to record the excavation of a well by the Mahadandanayaka Saka Sridharavarmman, son of Saka Nanda. It refers itself to the 13th regnal year of Sridharavarmman, which shows that although styled as the general, he was enjoying the powers and privileges of an independent ruler. Evidently he belongs to one of those Western Satraps families that settled in Western India in the early centuries of the Christian era. He calls himself a dharma-vijayi, i.e. "the righteous conqueror" in line 2, and in line 3 there is reference to dharm-asi, i.e. "the sword of righteousness". In all likelihood Sridharavarmman originally served under some royal family, and later, throwing off the yoke, assumed the position of an independent ruler. 

The inscription is currently in the Sanchi Museum, where it has the number A98.

References

Western Satraps